Live at the Royal Albert Hall is a live album by Emerson, Lake & Palmer. It was recorded at two concerts at the Royal Albert Hall during the Black Moon tour in early October 1992.

The shows were the band's first concert appearances in their native England since 1974. The concert was broadcast live on BBC Radio One, and the band was introduced on stage by DJ Alan "Fluff" Freeman, audible at the beginning of the first track.

Highlights of the album include a 9-minute version of "Tarkus," the song "Black Moon," and "Finale," which is a medley of "Fanfare for the Common Man," "America," and "Rondo."

Track listing
"Karn Evil 9: 1st Impression, Pt. 2" (Keith Emerson, Greg Lake) – 1:50
"Tarkus" – 9:26
"Eruption" (Emerson)
"Stones of Years" (Emerson, Lake)
"Iconoclast" (Emerson)
"Knife-Edge" (Leoš Janáček, arr. by Emerson, Lake, Richard Fraser) – 5:26
"Paper Blood" (Emerson, Lake, Carl Palmer) – 4:09
"Romeo and Juliet" (Sergei Prokofiev) – 3:41
"Creole Dance" (Alberto Ginastera) – 3:20
"Still...You Turn Me On" (Lake) – 3:13
"Lucky Man" (Lake) – 4:38
"Black Moon" (Emerson, Lake, Palmer) – 6:31
"Pirates" (Emerson, Lake, Peter Sinfield) – 13:21
"Finale" – 14:40
"Fanfare for the Common Man" (Aaron Copland, arr. by Emerson, Lake, Palmer)
"America" (Leonard Bernstein, Stephen Sondheim)
"Rondo" (Dave Brubeck, arr. by Emerson)

Personnel
Keith Emerson – keyboards
Greg Lake – bass, guitars, vocals
Carl Palmer – drums

Video Release
A DVD version of the concert is also available. Originally released in 1996, it has a slightly different running order (Closer to the actual setlist for the tour) and contains three tracks not included on the CD ("From the Beginning", "Honky Tonk Train Blues" and "Pictures at an Exhibition"), but omits "Still...You Turn Me On" and "Black Moon". Some performances also differ from their CD counterparts, probably due to the use of material from the other concert.

The original DVD cover showed pictures of the band members, but the most recent reissue (from early 2009 by Shout! Factory, who has also reissued much of the band's CD catalog) was changed to match the CD cover.

DVD track listing:
"Introduction"
"Karn Evil 9: 1st Impression, Pt. 2"
"Tarkus"
"Eruption"
"Stones of Years"
"Iconoclast"
"Knife-Edge"
"Paper Blood"
"Creole Dance"
"From the Beginning" (Lake)
"Lucky Man"
"Honky Tonk Train Blues" (Meade Lux Lewis)
"Romeo and Juliet"
"Pirates"
"Pictures at an Exhibition"
"Promenade" (Modest Mussorgsky, arr. by Emerson)
"The Gnome" (Mussorgsky, Palmer)
"Promenade" (Mussorgsky, Lake)
"The Hut of Baba Yaga" (Mussorgsky, arr. by Emerson)
"Drum Solo"
"The Hut of Baba Yaga"
"The Great Gates of Kiev" (Mussorgsky, Lake)
"Finale"
"Fanfare for the Common Man"
"America"
"Rondo"

Charts

References 

Live albums recorded at the Royal Albert Hall
Emerson, Lake & Palmer live albums
1993 live albums